The 2012–13 All-Ireland Senior Club Hurling Championship was the 43rd staging of the All-Ireland championship since its establishment by the Gaelic Athletic Association in 1970. The draw for the 2012-13 fixtures took place in August 2012. The championship began on 14 October 2012 and ended on 17 March 2013. Loughgiel Shamrocks were the defending champions.

St. Thomas's secured the title with a 1-11 to 1-9 defeat of Kilcormac–Killoughey in the All-Ireland final.

Teams
A total of sixteen teams contested the championship, including all of the representative teams from the 2011–12. The Armagh champions and the Carlow champions joined these teams in 2012-13.

The 2012–13 championship also saw a number of first-time participants. Kilcormac–Killoughey of Offaly, Swatragh of Derry and St. Thomas's of Galway won their first county championship titles and represented their respective counties in their respective provincial championships.

Team summaries

Participating clubs

Fixtures

Leinster Senior Club Hurling Championship

Munster Senior Club Hurling Championship

Ulster Senior Club Hurling Championship

All-Ireland Senior Club Hurling Championship

Championship statistics

Scoring
First goal of the championship: Ruairí Convery for Swatragh against Portaferry (Ulster semi-final, 14 October 2012)

Discipline

 First red card of the championship: Ruairí Convery for Swatragh against Portaferry, 43 minutes (14 October 2012)

Miscellaneous

 Thurles Sarsfield's win the Munster title for the first time in their history.
 The Leinster semi-final between Oulart-The Ballagh and Ballyhale Shamrocks was postponed due to torrential rain. Referee Barry Kelly took the decision for player safety.
 Kilcormac–Killoughey win the Leinster title for the first time in their history while Oulart-The Ballagh lose their third successive provincial decider.

Top scorers

Top scorers overall

Top scorers in a single game

External links
 Leinster Senior Club Hurling Championship fixtures
 Munster Club Senior Hurling Championship team-by-team guide
 Ulster Senior Club Hurling Championship fixtures

References

2012 in hurling
2013 in hurling
All-Ireland Senior Club Hurling Championship